Idas Valley Stadium is a sports venue in Stellenbosch, South Africa, and an alternative home ground of Stellenbosch F.C.

Stellenbosch F.C. and the local municipality worked in conjunction to get the stadium up to the required standard for the 2018–19 National First Division.

References

Stellenbosch
Soccer venues in South Africa
Multi-purpose stadiums in South Africa
Sports venues in the Western Cape
Stellenbosch F.C.